من سيربح 2 مليون (English translation: Who will win 2 million?, transliteration: Man sa yarbah 2 malyoon) was a Middle Eastern and North African game show based on the original British format of Who Wants to Be a Millionaire?. The show was hosted by George Kurdahi.
Top prize was SRls 2,000,000. This is the successor of the first season of Man sa yarbah al malyoon with SRls 1,000,000 as the top-prize. The first season of Man sa yarbah al malyoon was aired since Monday, September 14, 1998 after the tenth episode of British WWTBAM to help and prevent the hiatus situation of British WWTBAM.

Money tree

References

Who Wants to Be a Millionaire?